Jessea is a genus of Central American plants in the tribe Senecioneae within the sunflower family, closely related to Senecio.

The genus is named in honor of US botanist Jesse More Greenman (1867-1951), formerly of the Missouri Botanical Garden.

 Species
 Jessea cooperi (Greenm.) H.Rob. & Cuatrec. - Panamá, Costa Rica
 Jessea gunillae B.Nord. - Costa Rica
 Jessea megaphylla (Greenm.) H.Rob. & Cuatrec. - Panamá, Costa Rica
 Jessea multivenia (Benth. ex Benth.) H.Rob. & Cuatrec. - Costa Rica

References

External links

Asteraceae genera
Senecioneae
Flora of Central America